The Somali Ambassador in Beijing is the official representative of the Government in Mogadishu to the Government of the People's Republic of China.

List of representatives

China–Somalia relations

References 

Ambassadors of Somalia to China
China
Somalia